Bodiggo is a hamlet in Cornwall, England, United Kingdom. It is situated half-a-mile north of Luxulyan (where the 2011 Census population is included), five miles (8 km) north-east of St Austell. Bodiggo was described in the Domesday Book.

References

External links

Hamlets in Cornwall